Gastón Ángel Obledo Loo (born 6 February 1966) is a Mexican football manager and former player.

References

1966 births
Living people
Association football midfielders
Atlas F.C. footballers
Correcaminos UAT footballers
Atlante F.C. footballers
C.F. Monterrey players
Liga MX players
Mexican football managers
Footballers from San Luis Potosí
People from San Luis Potosí City
Mexican footballers